Weightlifting competitions at the 2014 Commonwealth Games in Glasgow, Scotland were held between 24 July and 2 August at the Scottish Exhibition and Conference Centre. Included with the weightlifting event were four powerlifting events for disabled athletes.

Schedule

Medal table

Events

Men's events

Women's events
 
* The women's 53 kg competition was originally won by 16-year-old Chika Amalaha of Nigeria. Following a failed doping test, Amalaha was stripped of her medal and placement, and the medals were redistributed.

Powerlifting

Participating nations

References

External links
 
 Official results book – Weightlifting
 Official results book – Powerlifting

 
2014 Commonwealth Games events
2014 in weightlifting
2014
Weightlifting in Scotland
Parasports competitions
International weightlifting competitions hosted by the United Kingdom
Powerlifting at the Commonwealth Games